The 2015 Women's Knockout Cup was New Zealand's women's 22nd knockout football competition.

The 2015 competition had three rounds before the quarter-finals, semi-finals, and a final. Competition was run in three regions (Northern, Central, Southern) until the quarter-finals, from which stage the draw was open. In all, 31 teams entered the competition.

The 2015 final
The 2015 final was played between Glenfield Rovers from Auckland and Massey University from Palmerston North at Trust Arena, West Auckland before the men's Chatham Cup final. Glenfield Rovers beat Massey 4–0, claiming their third title in five years while inflicting Massey University second lost in the finals after they lost in 2013.

Results
All results are taken from the following sources: The Ultimate New Zealand Soccer Website and Capital Football Season Review.

Round 1
Central/Capital Region

Mainland Region

All teams listed below received byes to the second round.
Northern Region: Eastern Suburbs, Ellerslie, Fencibles United, Metro, North Force, Papakura City, Papatoetoe, Pukekohe, Three Kings United, Western Springs.
Central/Capital Region: Massey University, Seatoun, Upper Hutt City, Valeron Wanderers, Wellington United.
Mainland Region: Cashmere Technical, Coastal Spirit.
Southern Region: Dunedin Technical, Otago University, Queenstown Rovers, Roslyn Wakari.

These three teams received byes to the third round.
Northern Region: Claudelands Rovers, Forrest Hill-Milford United, Glenfield Rovers.

Round 2
All results are taken from the following sources: The Ultimate New Zealand Soccer Website and Capital Football Season Review.

Northern Region

Central/Capital Region

Mainland Region

Southern Region

Round 3
All results and dates are taken from the following sources: The Ultimate New Zealand Soccer Website, RSSSF and Capital Football Season Review.

Northern Region

Central/Capital Region

Mainland/Southern Region

Quarter-finals
All results and dates are taken from the following sources: The Ultimate New Zealand Soccer Website, RSSSF and Capital Football Season Review.

Semi-finals
All results and dates are taken from the following sources: The Ultimate New Zealand Soccer Website, RSSSF and Capital Football Season Review.

Final

References

External links
Women's knockout cup section on the New Zealand Football website

Women's Knockout Cup/Kate Sheppard Cup
Women's Knockout Cup
Women's Knockout Cup
Women's Knockout Cup
football